The veined tree frog (Trachycephalus typhonius), or common milk frog, is a species of frog in the family Hylidae. This species was previously within the genus Phrynohyas, which was recently synonymized with Trachycephalus .
It is found in Central and South America.
Its natural habitats are subtropical or tropical dry forest, subtropical or tropical moist lowland forest, subtropical or tropical moist shrubland, subtropical or tropical dry lowland grassland, rivers, intermittent rivers, freshwater lakes, freshwater marshes, intermittent freshwater marshes, arable land, pastureland, plantations, rural gardens, urban areas, heavily degraded former forest, water storage areas, and ponds. The veined tree frog is nocturnal, and can typically be found in tree branches and in areas with large amounts of vegetation. This frog is one of several other tree frogs in the family Hylidae that secrete a toxic substance from their skin that produces extreme irritation and pain when in contact with mucosal membrane surfaces. 

The veined tree frog has been observed being eaten by a mantis.

References

 La Marca, E., Azevedo-Ramos, C., Scott, N., Aquino, L., Silvano, D., Coloma, L.A., Ron, S., Faivovich, J., Santos-Barrera, G., Solís, F., Ibáñez, R., Chaves, G., Wilson, L.D. & Hardy, J. 2004.  Trachycephalus venulosus.   2006 IUCN Red List of Threatened Species.   Downloaded on 22 July 2007.
Tanacs, L., MD, & Littlefair, E., BSc. (2014, December). Symptoms and treatment of acute conjunctivitis caused by ... Retrieved March 27, 2021, from https://www.researchgate.net/publication/269179448_Symptoms_and_Treatment_of_Acute_Conjunctivitis_Caused_by_Skin_Secretions_of_Veined_Tree_Frog_Trachycephalus_Venulosus Wilderness & environmental medicine, 2014, Vol.25 (4), p.486-487

Trachycephalus
Amphibians of Central America
Frogs of South America
Amphibians described in 1768
Taxonomy articles created by Polbot
Taxa named by Josephus Nicolaus Laurenti